Sei Bingai is a subdistrict of Langkat Regency. It borders Binjai to the north, Kuala and Salapian to the west, Deli Serdang Regency to the east, and Karo Regency to the south. Most people in Sei Bingai are Karo. A majority of people in Sei Bingai are Muslims, as the Karo are predominantly, but not entirely Christian in this area.

Agriculture
There are 6,509 hectares of oil palm, 6,077 hectares of sawah (wet rice), 7,125 hectares of maize, 1,449 hectares of Natural rubber, 1,150 hectares of cocoa beans, 720 hectares of sugar palm, 308 hectares of pinang, among other crops, grown in the area. There is also a palm oil factory in Tanjung Gunung, along with other minor cottage industries.

References

Langkat Regency